Blastovalva is a genus of moths in the family Gelechiidae.

Species
 Blastovalva anisochroa Janse, 1960
 Blastovalva haplotypa Janse, 1960
 Blastovalva paltobola (Meyrick, 1921)

References

Anacampsinae